Richard Rowland may refer to:

Richard A. Rowland (1880–1947), American studio executive and film producer
Rich Rowland (born 1964), former baseball player
Dick Rowland (1902–?), African-American shoe shiner

See also
Richard Rowlands (1550s–1640), Anglo-Dutch antiquary